David Low (born 23 November 1983 in Singapore) is a Singaporean former footballer. He is mostly known for his peripatetic career which has taken him to 11 different countries, including Singapore and sees retired American footballer Jay DeMerit as an inspiration.

Early life

Living in South Africa for 7 years, Low was called up to the Singaporean National Service aged 17.

Career

New Zealand

For some of the 2013–14 New Zealand Football Championship, Low was part of Otago United's defense.

Mongolia

Traveling to Mongolia in 2012 to play for Khoromkhon of the local Premier League, the Singaporean midfielder lived in an apartment with the other foreign imports, helping them clinch that year's Borgio Cup, beating Ulaanbaatar City Bank 7–0 in the final. The club went on to a second-place finish in the league.

Cameroon
In 2015, Low joined Canon Yaoundé of the Cameroonian Elite One league.

In 2016, Low joined Cosmos de Bafia of the same league. He was on the bench for Cosmos in a league encounter against Botafogo, leading people to question his Asian origin, with many thinking he was Chinese. Low left the club in mid 2016 and returned to Singapore.

In 2018, Coton Sport FC de Garoua offered Low a contract but was declined by Low due to concerns about accommodation and safety as the club is located north of Cameroon and near the Nigerian border where the Boko Haram operates in.

Netherlands

In 2018, Low signed with Dutch side NEC Nijmegen, playing in Eerste Divisie, the second-highest tier of football in Netherlands, as a non contract player.

Personal life 
Low returned to Singapore in 2016 and worked briefly as a security systems administrator in a bank.

References

External links 
 Fieldoo Profile
 David Low, pemain Singapura yang menjelajah dunia (bahagian 1) 
 What They're Saying: David Low
 Journeyman Low wants milestone end to 13-year career

1983 births
Living people
Singaporean footballers
Singaporean sportspeople of Chinese descent
Association football midfielders
Tampines Rovers FC players
Southern United FC players
Geylang International FC players
Offenburger FV players
Western Mass Pioneers players
Khoromkhon players
Singapore Premier League players
Singaporean expatriate footballers
Singaporean expatriate sportspeople in South Africa
Singaporean expatriate sportspeople in the United States
Singaporean expatriate sportspeople in Australia
Singaporean expatriate sportspeople in Germany
Singaporean expatriate sportspeople in Switzerland
Singaporean expatriate sportspeople in Thailand
Singaporean expatriate sportspeople in Mongolia
Singaporean expatriate sportspeople in New Zealand
Singaporean expatriate sportspeople in Cameroon
Singaporean expatriate sportspeople in Hungary
Expatriate footballers in Hungary
Expatriate footballers in Thailand
Expatriate soccer players in the United States
Expatriate footballers in Cameroon
Expatriate soccer players in Australia
Expatriate association footballers in New Zealand
Expatriate footballers in Germany
Expatriate soccer players in South Africa
Expatriate footballers in Mongolia
Expatriate footballers in Switzerland